Rugby Challenge may refer to:
 Rugby Challenge (South Africa), a South African rugby union competition established in 2017
 Rugby Challenge (video game), a video game released in 2011